Udo Schröder (born 12 February 1950 in Herne) is a German former wrestler who competed in the 1972 Summer Olympics.

References

External links
 

1950 births
Living people
People from Herne, North Rhine-Westphalia
Sportspeople from Arnsberg (region)
Olympic wrestlers of East Germany
Wrestlers at the 1972 Summer Olympics
German male sport wrestlers